Nepalese non-government organisations in Hong Kong consist of all the community-based non-government organisations (NGOs) set up to assist the Nepalese ethnic minority communities living in Hong Kong.   The NGOs work with the communities to meet various needs: social care, education, sports, music, and so on. These NGOs were established or founded by various ethnic groups ranging from Chinese to Nepalese themselves. Some of them have their own communicating channels within the community or even to their fellow countrymen outside. Most NGOs are periodically active. A few NGO groups operate continuously and are active in different levels.

NGOs serving Nepalese in Hong Kong can be mainly categorised into two types: either founded by Hong Kong Nepalese or Hong Kong Chinese. Some NGOs, of which organisers are hardly traceable, are categorised as “others”.

Some Nepalese NGOs organised purely by Nepalese, like the Hong Kong Integrated Nepalese Society, focuses on providing services and aid for Nepalese in Hong Kong.

The NGOs organised largely by Chinese serve various ethnic minorities including Nepalese, such as Southern Democratic Alliance, Christian Action (Integrated Service Centre for Ethnic Minorities) and the Hong Kong Christian Service. Southern Democratic Alliance aims at uniting South Asians and Hong Kong people together. It demands stronger anti-discrimination laws and tries to satisfy the desires of South Asians, especially Nepalese. Christian Actions has been serving the ethnic minorities since 2003, especially those in Yau Tsim Mong and Kwun Tong.

Apart from the above, some NGOs categorized as “others” are difficult to trace but fragmented records can be found in different documents or media. It is arduous to reach their chairmen or members to prove their visibility. Hong Kong Tamang Ghedung ( Association ), Lamjung Sewa Samiti, Hong Kong, Miteri Service Committee, Hong Kong and Hong Kong Terhathum Forum are some examples.

Contribution / Works of Nepalese NGOs in Hong Kong

Voicing out for Nepalese in Public  
Nepalese NGOs voice out for Hong Kong Nepalese in public through organising protests and commenting on social issues respectively. There was a protest organised by Hong Kong Nepalese Federation in light of a Hong Kong policeman's fatal shooting of Bahadur Limbu on March 17, 2009.  The protestors demanded an apology and a fair investigation about Limbu's death. They urged to suspend the current Constable, Ka-Ki Hui from force-involving duties during the course of investigation. They also demanded an English inquest for the case.

The NGOs also make commentaries on social issues through the media and in some meetings of the Legislative Council of Hong Kong. For example, the president of Hong Kong Nepalese Security Guard, Palungwa Dil Bahadur stated that the minimum wage should be more than $35 when being interviewed. The Far East Overseas Nepalese Association (Hong Kong) commented on the consultation document of Race Discrimination Ordinance.

Community Services  
Nepalese NGOs provide six types of community services basically. First is integration.  Hong Kong Integrated Nepalese Society (HINS) conducts English classes regularly. The second is social care. HINS has been holding a blood donating program together with Hong Kong Red Cross Society on the occasion of Lord Buddha’s birthday since 2004. The third is about education. HINS organises programmes to arouse parents’ awareness against drug abuse to prevent the young Nepalese from taking drugs.

The Nepalese NGOs organise lots of festivals to celebrate their national culture and religions as well. Dashain and Tihar (incorporating Deepawali Festival) are celebrated by the Far East Dharan Hong Kong Forum, Urlabari Pariwar Hong Kong and the Magar Association Hong Kong. Teej Festival is celebrated by the HINS and Baglung Society Hong Kong. Besides Newar Samaj, Hong Kong celebrates Newar New Year and Mha Puja every year.

There are annual activities to promote their culture, such as the NRN Day organised by the Non-Resident Nepali Association Hong Kong (NRNA HK). Actually the NRN Day is also organised around the world every year by different branches of the NRNA. The Hong Kong Nepali Kala Mandir organises the Nepali Cultural Week every year, usually with Nepalese parades, dances and singing.

There are some online platforms like HKNepal.com, Alopalo.com, HongKongNepali.com, jpthk.com and khursani.com, which let Nepalese exchange the information and opinions. They sponsor and report events as well. Moreover, HINS held a discussion forum on anti-legislation drafting consultation. The language used was Nepalese with little English.

Some Nepalese NGOs help directing Nepalese to the government like the Nepalese Community Support Team, locating in Jordan. It aims at providing information about various governmental services and assisting elderly, the disabled  and single parents to approach relevant services.

Leisure 
Mainly four kinds of sport associations are founded by Nepalese in Hong Kong to cater Nepalese needs: football, tennis, taekwondo and bodybuilding.

For football, Hong Kong Nepalese Football Association (HKNFA) aims at promoting football within the Nepalese communities in Hong Kong, especially among the youth. Deurali Football Club is one of the football clubs under HKNFA. It encourages Nepalese youth to play football and makes a pure Nepalese Football Team participate in the Hong Kong League. For tennis, Hong Kong Nepalese Tennis Society is founded to gather Nepalese tennis fans in Hong Kong and organises tennis competitions. Furthermore, Hong Kong Nepalese Taekwondo Association aims at fostering friendship between Taekwondo players of various races and holds up-grading tests for members. Lastly, the Hong Kong Nepal Bodybuilding Association is active in holding conventions, press conferences and Mr. Nepal - Hong Kong China Bodybuilding Championships.

Moreover, there is a music organisation, Hong Kong Nepalese Rock Forum, which enables its members to share musical information and promotes young Nepalese music talents.

Religion  
Punarjiwan Society was established by Volunteer Recovering Nepali Ex-addicts to help Nepali recovery addicts in yau Ma tei.
Religious needs of Hong Kong Nepalese are also met by the Nepalese NGOs. For Christianity, there are seven Nepalese Christian Churches: the United Nepali Christian Church (UNCC), Hosanna Nepali Church and the Nepali Union Church. UNCC holds masses twice a week while the other two are on every Sunday. They aim at promoting Christian teachings among Hong Kong Nepalese.

For Hinduism, Sathya Sai Baba Center of Hong Kong  is a recognized Hong Kong Nepalese charity. It has six bhajan groups and publishes Sai Quarterly newsletter and Sai Sarathi. They conduct value-based education through different kind of activities.

Apart from Christianity and Hinduism, Heavenly Path Hong Kong registered in 2006 promotes thoughts of the Supreme Master Almighty Godangel.

Support for Business of Nepalese in Hong Kong and Investments in Nepal  
Nepalese NGOs also support the business of Hong Kong Nepalese and their investments in Nepal. Nepal Chamber of Commerce Hong Kong (HCCHK) provides an updating database listing information of potential buyers and sellers. It also updates with business leads and attracts frequent users from different countries. Business news, economic analysis and Hong Kong Government tenders, members and company profiles are provided as well. Furthermore, it is a representative to discuss business matters with the government. Apart from helping local Nepalese business, HCCHK and Non-Resident Nepali Association Hong Kong facilitate foreign investments in Nepal.

Visibility in Hong Kong

Opinions from people other than Hong Kong Nepalese

Government 
Nepalese did appear in the documents of government. Hong Kong Nepalese Federation and HINS signed the Briefing on Hong Kong's Race Discrimination Bill (RDB) prepared for the United Nations Committee on the Elimination of all Forms of racial discrimination in 2008. RDB was passed and has been operating since 2009. Besides, Nepalese is put under the category named “ethnic minority population” in the population census of 2001 and 2006 by the Census and Statistics Department.

Media  
Nepalese NGOs seldom appear in media platform in Hong Kong.  There was a protest with more than 2000 Hong Kong ethnic minority participants,  mostly Nepalese, after Limbu was shot dead by a policeman in 2009. Reports were made on all major press like the TVB, Apple Daily, Oriental Daily and the South China Morning Post. This was the only major incident involving Nepalese reported by the mainstream media.

The Nepalese also sometimes appear on some alternative media platforms. Hong Kong In-media always speaks up for the ethnic minorities in Hong Kong. Since 2003, the RTHK has been running the AM864, which lasts for 30 minutes, to cater Nepalese audiences’ needs. Also, there was an episode of a TV programme, Hong Kong Story, by RTHK in 2009. It praised Nepalese contributions to Hong Kong as vanguards of British troops during World War I, II and as helpers for Hong Kong Police during the British colonial period.  However, the Nepalese have had a negative image in the Chinese mainstream media, which tend to stereotype the Nepalese in Hong Kong as illegal immigrants or lazy vagrants. For the reports about Limbu being shot dead, only in the reports of Mingpao and Economic Daily was Limbu portrayed as harmless instead of being a villain.

Descriptions by Hong Kong Nepalese themselves  
Some Nepalese organisations representatives explain their invisibility with the following reasons. During Nepalese Cultural Week, Rai Kamala, the principal of Sagarmatha commented that Nepalese culture and religion could live in communion with Hong Kong people. However, the language is the barrier.  Also he hoped that the government would pay attention to their education problem. Besides, Mr. Kisan Rai, reported by the Everest Weekly, stressed their identity as Hong Kong people and the peaceful manner of their protest during the protest .

References

External links

	He, Crystal, & Zhang, Stacy. (January 2, 2010).  “Nepalese discover greater freedom, new religion in HK”. HKBU.edu.
	Lung, James. (2010, April). History of Gurkhas Security Guards Union Hong Kong (GSGUHK).
	News. HKNepal.com. Retrieved August 20, 2012
	"Celebrating 3-21!! International Day for the Elimination of RAcial Discrimination Carnival" 香港融樂會活動與計劃. Retrieved November 12, 2010. Archived from 
	Hosanna Nepil Church
	Mr. Nepal- Hong Kong China Bodybuilding Championships photos. June 9, 2010. Retrieved November 18, 2010.
	Race Relations Unit Useful Links. Retrieved November 9, 2010.
	United Nepali Christian Church Blog.  Retrieved November 18, 2010. 
	葉蔭聰，2006年4月23日，我今天與尼泊爾朋友一起上街，獨立媒體， (Ye Yin Tsung, April 23, 2006, "Today, I took to the streets with the Nepalese friends", Hong Kong:The Independent Media ) 
	陳浩倫.，2009年4月12日，媒體玩謝尼漢四步曲，中大學生報::斟，取自  (Chen Haolun (April 12, 2009) "The media play Xene Han Four Steps in the Student Press")
	"Oi Wan, Lam. (March 19, 2009). Hong Kong: Ng-hao big-naug or you are dead!". Global Voices Online.

Non-profit organisations based in Hong Kong
Nepalese diaspora in Hong Kong